The Martyrdom of Saint George is a 1566 oil-on-canvas painting by Paolo Veronese, produced for the high altar of the church of San Giorgio in Braida in Verona, dedicated to Saint George, where it still hangs. It was produced in Verona, the artist's birthplace, whilst he was back there to marry Elena, daughter of his teacher Antonio Badile.

In 1732 the Veronese scholar Scipione Maffei recorded that a few years earlier a decision was taken "to unpick the canvas of the large painting by Paolo [Veronese], which was then badly restored", though he does not state why this happened or what happened to the work afterwards, despite calling the decision "a heinous crime" After the Veronese Easter it and Saint Barnabas Healing the Sick were both seized from the church by the French occupiers on 18 May and folded up for transport, arriving in Paris on 6 August. There it was stated to be "in good condition".

The Austrian Empire took custody of the painting on 27 September 1815 after Napoleon's fall and on 15 March the following year it returned to its original church in Verona after another restoration, with uncertain results. The canvas was again detached to be sent to Florence during the First World War to save it from bombardment, returning to Verona after the war. A large tear occurred on the saint's cloak during transport and it was again restored under the Veronese scholar Attilio Motta. Other important restorations of the work occurred in 1987 and 2014.

References

Bibliography (in Italian)
 
 
 

Paintings in Verona
Paintings by Paolo Veronese
Paintings of Saint George (martyr)
1566 paintings
Oil on canvas paintings